Alaba hungerfordi is a species of sea snail, a marine gastropod mollusc in the family Litiopidae.

Description

Distribution

References

External links

Litiopidae
Gastropods described in 2006